Muhammad Ibni bin Khozaimi (born 19 September 1994) is a Malaysian footballer who plays as a midfielder for PKNP.

References

External links
 

1994 births
Living people
Malaysian footballers
Malaysia Premier League players
Malaysia Super League players
PKNP FC players
Association football midfielders